James Sie is an American actor and author. He was the voice of an animated Jackie Chan and several other characters in Jackie Chan Adventures, Master Monkey in Kung Fu Panda: Legends of Awesomeness, taking over for Chan, and Eddy Raja in the Uncharted series. His debut novel, Still Life Las Vegas, was published in August 2015.

Career
He is known as a "Jackie Chan impersonator" as his voice bears a strong resemblance to Chan especially in the Kids' WB animated television series Jackie Chan Adventures. He also voices Shendu in the same series. He is the voice of Master Monkey for Nickelodeon's Kung Fu Panda: Legends of Awesomeness, replacing Jackie Chan from the movies (Sie voiced Monkey in all of the video games). Other popular roles include Chinese American footballer Kwan in Danny Phantom, Chen Lin in W.I.T.C.H., Fin Fang Foom and Radioactive Man in Marvel: Ultimate Alliance and Eddy Raja in Uncharted: Drake's Fortune, Sie did several voices for Avatar: The Last Airbender, guest-voiced as an Asian scientist named Jimmy in Regular Show and also voices Lord Taran Zhu in World of Warcraft: Mists of Pandaria. He had a brief role as a Buddhist Lama in the 2021 The Simpsons episode "Wad Goals".

He starred on-camera, opposite Suzy Nakamura in Strawberry Fields. He also had roles in Chain Reaction. Sie wrote and performed the autobiographical one-person stage show, Talking With My Hands in 1999, about growing up in a Chinese/Italian household. His play, Island of the Blue Dolphins at the Lifeline Theatre in Chicago, Illinois was awarded the 1995 Joseph Jefferson Award Citation for New Work. James has also garnered two Jeff Citation nominations for his Lifeline adaptations of Dracula and A Wrinkle in Time, which was produced at Lincoln Center Institute in New York. He has received an After Dark Award for The Road to Graceland. His other adaptations include Randy Shilts' Talking AIDS to Death and Daniel Pinkwater's The Snarkout Boys and the Avocado of Death, which was also broadcast on WFMT's "Chicago Theatres on the Air".

Personal life
He is gay and has been married to singer-songwriter Douglas Wood since 2008. They have one child, Benjamin, whom they adopted from Vietnam.

Filmography

Film
 Chain Reaction (1996) – Ken Lim
 Strawberry Fields (1997) – Luke
 U.S. Marshals (1998) – Vincent Ling
 Bats (1999) – Sergeant James
 Ghost World (2001) – Steven
 Hero (2002) – Broken Sword (English dub, voice)
 Ice Age: The Meltdown (2006) – Freaky Male (voice)
 Chill Out, Scooby-Doo! (2007) – Pemba
 Back to the Sea (2012) – Cook Liu (voice)
 Secrets of the Furious Five (2008, Short) – Great Master Viper (voice)
 When Marnie Was There (2014) – Kazuhiko (English version, voice)
 Kung Fu Panda: Secrets of the Scroll (2016, Short) – Master Monkey / Great Master Viper (voice)
 How to Train Your Dragon: The Hidden World (2019) – Chaghatai Khan (voice)
 White Snake (2019) – Dark General (English dub, voice)

Television

 Family Law (2000) – Lana Dagchen
 Jackie Chan Adventures (2000–2005) – Jackie Chan / Shendu / Chow (voice)
 Time Squad (2001) – Confucius (voice)
 Even Stevens (2002) – Chemistry Teacher
 King of the Hill (2008) – General Gum
 Without a Trace (2003) – Walter
 Game Over (2004) – Sam Chang (voice)
 Justice League (2004) – Wind Dragon / General Kwan (voice)
 Danny Phantom (2004–2007) – Kwan
 The Batman vs. Dracula (2005) – (voice)
 What's New, Scooby-Doo? (2005) – Louie Hong Fa (voice)
 The Adventures of Jimmy Neutron: Boy Genius (2005) – Yoo Yee / Elderly Monk / Ninja (voice)
 Avatar: The Last Airbender (2005–2006) – The Cabbage Merchant / Oyaji (voice)
 Numbers (2005–2009) – ND FBI Agent / Lab Tech / FBI Tech / Technician
 The Emperor's New School (2006) – (voice)
 Shorty McShorts' Shorts (2006) – Cory (voice)
 Hellboy: Sword of Storms (2006, TV movie) – (voice)
 Handy Manny (2006) – Mr. Chu (voice)
 W.I.T.C.H (2006) – Chen Lin (voice)
 The Replacements (2006–2008) – Master Pho (voice)
 Random! Cartoons (2007) – Monkey Butt (voice)
 The Grim Adventures of Billy & Mandy (2007) – Plain Cow (voice)
 The Life and Times of Juniper Lee (2007) – Kai Yee (voice)
 Curious George (2007–2008) – Grocer's Son / The Collector (voice)
 The Starter Wife (2008) – Doug
 The Secret Saturdays (2008–2009) – Shoji Fuzen (voice)
 Back at the Barnyard (2009) – Kobe Cows (voice)
 Wolverine and the X-Men (2009) – Yakuza Ninja / Yakuza Leader / Sensei Ogun (voice)
 Special Agent Oso (2009) – (voice)
 Batman: The Brave and the Bold (2009–2011) – Atom / Dyna-Mite (voice)
 Ni Hao, Kai-Lan (2010) – Fox King (voice)
 Regular Show (2010) – Jimmy (guest voiced)
 The Chicago Code (2011) – Daniel
 Kung Fu Panda: Legends of Awesomeness (2011–2016) – Monkey (voice, replacing Jackie Chan)
 Kickin' It (2012) – Yin Chen
 The Legend of Korra (2012–2013) – Abbot Shung / Lau Gan-Lan (voice)
 Teenage Mutant Ninja Turtles (2012–2014) – Tsoi / Man (voice)
 Sofia the First (2013–2016) – Emperor Quon (voice)
 Fancy Nancy (2018) – Mr. Chen (voice)
 Kung Fu Panda: The Paws of Destiny (2018) – Bunnidharma / Sun Wukong
 The Lion Guard (2019) – Smun / Sãhasí (voice)
 Stillwater (2020) – Stillwater (voice)
 Carmen Sandiego (2021) – Huang Li (voice)
 The Simpsons (2021) – Lama (voice)
 Star Trek: Lower Decks (2021) – Kaltorus (voice)
 Kung Fu Panda: The Dragon Knight (2022) – Lao (voice)

Video games

 Bruce Lee: Quest of the Dragon (2002) – Additional voices
 Command & Conquer: Generals (2003)
 Command & Conquer: Generals – Zero Hour  (2003)
 Shellshock: Nam '67 (2004) – Diem
 Shark Tale (2004) – Additional Tenant Fish
 Jackie Chan Adventures (2004) – Jackie
 World of Warcraft: Mists of Pandaria (2004) – Lord Taran Zhu
 X-Men Legends II: Rise of Apocalypse (2005) – Sunfire
 Guild Wars Factions (2006) – Suun
 Marvel Heroes (2006) – Jimmy Woo
 Marvel: Ultimate Alliance (2006) – Ancient One / Fin Fang Foom / Mandarin / Neutron / Radioactive Man
 Lost Planet: Extreme Condition (2006) – Dennis Isenberg
 Spider-Man 3 (2007) – Dragon Tail Thug
 Syphon Filter: Logan's Shadow (2007) – Dr. Shen Rei
 Uncharted: Drake's Fortune (2007) – Eddy Raja
 The Golden Compass (2007) – Samoyed / Trollesund
 Lost Planet: Colonies (2008) – Dennis Isenberg
 Kung Fu Panda (2008) – Master Monkey
 Metal Gear Solid 4: Guns of the Patriots (2008) – Jonathan
 Prototype (2009)
 Indiana Jones and the Staff of Kings (2009) – Blind Duck
 Uncharted 2: Among Thieves (2009) – Eddy Raja
 Uncharted: Eye of Indra (2009) – Eddy Raja
 Lost Planet 2 (2010) – Additional voices
 Blur (2010) – Jun
 Mafia II (2010) – Zhe Yun Wong
 Kung Fu Panda 2 (2011) – Master Monkey
 Uncharted 3: Drake's Deception (2011) – Eddy Raja
 Hitman: Absolution (2012) – The King of Chinatown / Larry Clay / Chicago Cops / Vixen Club Bouncers / Blackwater Guards 
 Fallout 4 (2015) – Jun Long / Doctor Sun
 Uncharted 4: A Thief's End (2016) – Eddy Raja
 Final Fantasy VII Remake (2020) – Professor Hojo
 Back 4 Blood, Tunnels of Terror expansion pack (2022) – Heng

References

External links
 
 

Living people
American male actors of Chinese descent
American male film actors
American male novelists
American male television actors
American male video game actors
American male voice actors
American gay actors
American gay writers
American LGBT people of Asian descent
Male actors from New Jersey
People from Summit, New Jersey
21st-century American novelists
21st-century American male writers
Year of birth missing (living people)